George Peter DeBoer (born June 13, 1968) is a Canadian professional ice hockey coach and former player. He is the head coach for the Dallas Stars of the National Hockey League (NHL). He is also a co-owner of the Oshawa Generals of the Ontario Hockey League (OHL).

A two-time winner of the OHL Coach of the Year award, DeBoer was an OHL head coach for 13 seasons with the Detroit Whalers (1995–1997), Plymouth Whalers (1997–2001) and Kitchener Rangers (2001–08), the latter of which he led to a Memorial Cup victory in 2003. He served as the head coach of the Florida Panthers from 2008 to 2011, the New Jersey Devils from 2011 to 2014, the San Jose Sharks from 2015 to 2019, and the Vegas Golden Knights from 2020 to 2022.

Playing career
DeBoer was drafted 237th overall by the Toronto Maple Leafs in the 1988 NHL Entry Draft. At the time, he was playing with the Windsor Spitfires in the OHL, and in his best offensive season, he scored 45 goals and 46 assists for 91 points. After Windsor, DeBoer went on to play for the Milwaukee Admirals of the International Hockey League (IHL), playing two full seasons with them. In his last season with the Admirals, he scored 27 goals and 34 assists for 61 points and retired after that season.

Coaching career

Detroit Whalers
DeBoer became an assistant coach for the Detroit Junior Red Wings during the 1994–95 season. During the 1995 off-season, the club was renamed the Detroit Whalers and DeBoer was promoted to the dual position of head coach-general manager after Paul Maurice left the team to become the coach of the NHL's Hartford Whalers. DeBoer guided the Whalers to a first-place finish in the West Division, as Detroit advanced to the third round in the playoffs. In 1996–97, Detroit struggled to a 26–34–6 record and was eliminated in the first round of the post-season.

Plymouth Whalers
The Whalers renamed themselves the Plymouth Whalers during the 1997 off-season, and the team rebounded to a second-place finish in the West Division with a 37–22–7 record – for the second time in three seasons, they advanced to the third round of the playoffs. In 1998–99, DeBoer led the team to an OHL-leading 106 points, earning them the Hamilton Spectator Trophy, and DeBoer winning the Matt Leyden Trophy as OHL Coach of the Year. Plymouth had a disappointing playoff run, however, as they were defeated by the underdog London Knights in the second round of the playoffs.

In 1999–2000, Plymouth once again had the best record in the league, earning DeBoer his second straight Matt Leyden Trophy. The Whalers advanced all the way to the J. Ross Robertson Cup Finals before losing to the Barrie Colts 4–2 in the seventh and series deciding game.

The Whalers had another very successful season in 2000–01, winning the West Division for the third consecutive season and having the second best record in the League. Plymouth got hot in the playoffs, winning their first nine games, and advanced to the J. Ross Robertson Cup for the second season in a row. In the final round, Plymouth lost to the Ottawa 67's in six games.

After the season, both DeBoer and his assistant, Steve Spott, decided to leave the Whalers and join the Kitchener Rangers in similar positions.

Kitchener Rangers
DeBoer took over a Kitchener team that had missed the OHL playoffs in the previous season and finished ten games under .500, and quickly the club showed improvement, as the Rangers finished in third place in the Midwest Division with a 35–22–10–1 record. The team was then swept in the first round of the playoffs by their Highway 7 rivals, the Guelph Storm.

The Rangers continued to improve in the 2002–03 season, winning the Hamilton Spectator Trophy as Kitchener had a League-best 100 points. In the playoffs, the Rangers quickly swept the Sault Ste. Marie Greyhounds in the first round, followed by a five-game series win over the Guelph Storm, setting up a Western Conference matchup against DeBoer's former team, the Plymouth Whalers. After the Whalers won the fifth game by a 2–1 score in overtime to take a 3–2 series lead, the Rangers rebounded and staved off elimination by winning the final two games of the series, advancing to the J. Ross Robertson Cup finals against the Ottawa 67's. Ottawa took the series opener, however, Kitchener rebounded and won four in a row to win the Cup and earn a berth in the 2003 Memorial Cup. DeBoer led the Rangers to a perfect 3–0 record during the round-robin portion of the tournament, sending Kitchener to the finals against the Hull Olympiques. The Rangers would easily defeat Hull 6–3 in the game to win their first Memorial Cup since 1982.

Kitchener saw themselves in a rebuilding season in 2003–04, however, as DeBoer helped the club finish fourth in the Western Conference with a 34–26–6–2 record. The team struggled in the playoffs, eventually losing to the Plymouth Whalers in five games in the opening round. The 2004–05 season saw the team once again finish in third in their division and fourth in the conference. DeBoer led the Rangers to a first round victory over the Erie Otters, then helped Kitchener to a stunning series sweep over the powerful Owen Sound Attack. In the third round, the Rangers faced the record-setting London Knights, and were quickly eliminated in five games.

In 2005–06, Kitchener saw their point total improve to 96, the third highest in the League. The team, however, was upset by the Owen Sound Attack in the first round of the playoffs. They then increased their point total to 98 in the following season, 2006–07, finishing third in the Western Conference and easily sweeping the Sarnia Sting in the first round. Kitchener would struggle in the second round, however, losing in five games to the Plymouth Whalers.

With the Rangers being named the host of the 2008 Memorial Cup, Kitchener put together one of the best regular season's in OHL history, finishing with a 53–11–4 record, earning a League-high 110 points to win the Hamilton Spectator Trophy. The DeBoer-led Rangers quickly swept the Plymouth Whalers and Sarnia Sting in the first two rounds before disposing the Sault Ste. Marie Greyhounds in the Western Conference Finals. In the J. Ross Robertson Cup Finals, the Rangers took the first three games of the series, though the opposing Belleville Bulls rebounded and took the next three games, setting up a deciding Game 7 matchup at the Kitchener Memorial Auditorium. In the last game of the series, the Rangers defeated the Bulls 4–1 to win the championship. During the 2008 Memorial Cup, the Rangers had a 2–1 record in the round-robin, setting up a rematch against the Bulls in the semi-finals. Kitchener exploded for a 9–0 win and would face the Western Hockey League (WHL)'s Spokane Chiefs in the final game. The Chiefs ultimately spoiled the Rangers' party, defeating Kitchener 4–1.

Florida Panthers
DeBoer decided to take the next step in his career, and on June 13, 2008, he was named head coach of the Florida Panthers in the National Hockey League (NHL). DeBoer led the Panthers a 41–30–11 record, tied with the Montreal Canadiens for eighth place in the Eastern Conference. The Panthers did not make the playoffs, as the Canadiens advanced due to winning the head-to-head series with the Panthers 3–1.

The Panthers struggled in the 2009–10 season and finished with a 32–37–13 record, last place in the Southeast Division. The team had an even worse 2010–11, as the team finished in last place in the Eastern Conference with a 30–40–12 record. After that season, the Panthers fired DeBoer with one year remaining on his contract.

New Jersey Devils
DeBoer was hired as head coach on July 19, 2011, by the New Jersey Devils following two interviews with former Devils general manager Lou Lamoriello. In his first season, DeBoer posted career highs in wins and point totals, guiding his team to the Stanley Cup playoffs for the first time in his coaching career. The Devils beat their first round opponent, DeBoer's former Florida Panthers, in double overtime in Game 7. The Devils would also go on to dispatch the Philadelphia Flyers in five games in round two and the New York Rangers in six games in the Eastern Conference Finals. It was the first time the New Jersey Devils had reached the Stanley Cup Finals since 2003. The Devils, however, lost the Finals to the Los Angeles Kings in six games.

The Devils slipped into last place in the Atlantic Division in the 2012–13 season, going 19–19–10 (48 points) in the lockout-shortened, 48-game season and failing to qualify for the 2013 playoffs.

In 2013–14, the Devils began the year with a 1–5–3 record and were not able to rebound from their poor start, finishing sixth in the newly created Metropolitan Division with a 35–29–18 record, failing to qualify for the post-season for their second straight season.

On December 26, 2014, after leading New Jersey to a subpar 12–17–7 record, the Devils fired DeBoer, replacing him with both Scott Stevens and Adam Oates in a dual-coaching setup.

San Jose Sharks
On May 28, 2015, DeBoer was named head coach of the San Jose Sharks, replacing former head coach Todd McLellan. In his first season, he led the Sharks to the playoffs after finishing third in their division. They defeated the Los Angeles Kings in 5 games, Nashville Predators in 7 in the second round, and won the Western Conference Finals against the St. Louis Blues in 6 games, making it the second time DeBoer has made the Stanley Cup Finals in his first year coaching a new team. On December 11, 2019, DeBoer was fired by the Sharks after a 15–16–2 start to the season.

Vegas Golden Knights
On January 15, 2020, DeBoer was hired as the head coach of the Vegas Golden Knights, replacing Gerard Gallant. The Golden Knights advanced to the Western Conference Finals but fell to the Dallas Stars in five games.

In the COVID-shortened 2020–21 season, DeBoer led the Knights to a 40–14–2 record, tied for the most points in the league with the Colorado Avalanche. They placed second in the West Division as they had fewer regulation wins than the Avalanche. They lost in the Stanley Cup semifinals to the Montreal Canadiens in six games.

The Golden Knights finished the 2021–22 season with a 43–31–8 record under DeBoer's leadership and failed to make the playoffs for the first time in franchise history. On May 16, 2022, DeBoer was relieved of his duties as head coach, finishing with an overall 98–50–12 record in Vegas.

Dallas Stars
On June 21, 2022, just over one month after his dismissal from Vegas, DeBoer was hired as the head coach of the Dallas Stars, replacing Rick Bowness.

Head coaching record

Personal life
DeBoer holds a law degree from both the University of Windsor and the University of Detroit as a graduate of the Dual JD Program. He and his wife Susan have three children. DeBoer's older son, Jack, plays for Niagara University. DeBoer's youngest son, Matt, plays for the College of the Holy Cross.

Awards
 Awarded Matt Leyden Trophy as OHL Coach of the Year (1999, 2000)

References

External links
 

1968 births
Living people
Canadian people of Dutch descent
Canadian expatriate ice hockey players in the United States
Canadian ice hockey centres
Canadian ice hockey coaches
Florida Panthers coaches
Ice hockey people from Ontario
Kitchener Rangers coaches
Milwaukee Admirals (IHL) players
New Jersey Devils coaches
Plymouth Whalers coaches
San Jose Sharks coaches
Toronto Maple Leafs draft picks
Windsor Spitfires players